Diversified financials is a specific category of the Global Industry Classification Standard (GICS) that is used by the financial community.  It includes a range of consumer and commercially oriented companies offering a wide variety of financial products and services, including various lending products (such as home equity loans and credit cards), insurance, and securities and investment products. 

Many of these firms in this category are non-banking financial companies, specialist organisations like stock exchanges or financial holding companies that were created through consolidation of banks, insurance companies and brokerage firms to become universal banks.

References

Financial services